Solo Flight is an album by pianist Ray Bryant recorded in 1976 and released by the Pablo label the following year.

Reception

AllMusic reviewer Scott Yanow said "Ray Bryant, although he has made many fine trio albums through the years, is at his best when playing unaccompanied solos ... This is an excellent recording".

Track listing
All compositions by Ray Bryant except where noted
 "In de Back Room" – 5:19
 "What Are You Doing the Rest of Your Life?" (Michel Legrand, Alan Bergman, Marilyn Bergman) – 4:17
 "Monkey Business" – 4:07
 "Blues in de Big Brass Bed" – 7:14
 "Moanin'" (Bobby Timmons) – 4:52
 "St. Louis Blues" (W. C. Handy) – 6:50
 "Take the "A" Train" (Billy Strayhorn) – 5:03
 "Lullaby" – 2:50

Personnel 
Ray Bryant – piano

References 

1977 albums
Ray Bryant albums
Pablo Records albums
Albums produced by Norman Granz